Varbó is a village in Borsod-Abaúj-Zemplén County in northeastern Hungary.

Etymology
Slavic Vrbov or Vrbové → Varbó. Vŕba - willow. 1303/1352/1449/1450 poss. Warbo. See e.g. Vrbové (Slovakia).

References

Populated places in Borsod-Abaúj-Zemplén County